Odostomia meijeri is a species of sea snail, a marine gastropod mollusc in the family Pyramidellidae, the pyrams and their allies.

Description
The size of the shell varies between 1.5 mm and 1.8 mm.

Distribution
This species occurs in the Atlantic Ocean off Mauritania.

References

External links
 
 To Encyclopedia of Life
 To World Register of Marine Species

meijeri
Gastropods described in 1998
Invertebrates of West Africa